Nasser Zolfaghari was an Iranian politician.

Background 
Zolfaghari hailed from a landed family and aristocratic family from Zanjan who was considered a local magnate.
Zolfaghari, whose estates had been expropriated by the government in Tabriz, had his men armed by the government of Ahmad Qavam and actively opposed their secessionist aspirations. According to Ervand Abrahamian, his family was able to meddle in the elections in that area played a determining role in the outcome.

Career 
Zolfaghari entered the 15th term of Iranian parliament from his hometown. He became a member of the Democrat Party of Qavam and joined the party's conservative faction. He helped the faction, which was allied with the royalist and anglophile deputies to reject the credentials of Hassan Arsanjani, and spoke in his opposition. He opined "How on earth did he obtain enough votes to win a parliamentary seat? Before the election, he was neither a deputy, nor a minister, nor a governor, nor even a district administrator. He was a mere journalist. And what is worse, a journalist with dubious political connections".

During the 16th term, he was considered an Independent. Zolfaghari was also a deputy in the 17th term. Along with his brother Mohammad, he supported government of Mosaddegh and introduced Mossadegh's qualified land reform bill in the parliament. After the coup d'état in 1953, Fazlollah Zahedi tried to unseated him for the next term.

References 

 

People from Zanjan, Iran
Democrat Party of Iran politicians
Members of the 15th Iranian Majlis
Members of the 16th Iranian Majlis
Members of the 17th Iranian Majlis
Mayors of Tehran
Deputies of Zanjan and Tarom
Year of birth missing